Infinite MHz is a TV show from the mid-1990s to early 2001 about PC games.  It primarily aired on public-access television cable TV in New England, and was based out of Cape Cod, MA.  It only held out for a brief period on national cable television.

The show followed a basic format.  First the introduction of the game with a discussion, then the intro of the actual game was played.  Then there was discussion on gameplay and various segments of interviews with the creators of the game.  Then a host would go in front of a Bluescreen showing the actual game.  They would point out gameplay and basic features.  Last, a cheat segment would come out, showing some key cheats and Easter eggs by the developers.  Each segment ran for 15 minutes and each show usually contained 2 games.

It had a small web presence and was famed for two web interviews from E3 of Prey that is widely circulated among fans of the now released game.

Controversy
In March 2001 there was an episode on Back Orifice, and a Trojan called SubSeven that exposed Computer viruses.  This episode disappeared under mysterious circumstances.  This was the last recorded show.

External links

Collection of Videos
Prey Interview from 1998

1990s American television series
American public access television shows